Władysław Marcinkowski (June 16, 1858 in Mieszków, Greater Poland Voivodeship – December 10, 1947 in Poznań) was a Polish sculptor who created a monument of Adam Mickiewicz in Milosław.

He was commander of Organizacja Wojskowa Związek Jaszczurczy (abbreviated OW ZJ), an organisation of Polish resistance in World War II

References

 Witold Jakóbczyk, Przetrwać na Wartą 1815–1914, Dzieje narodu i państwa polskiego, vol. III-55, Krajowa Agencja Wydawnicza, Warszawa 1989

1858 births
1947 deaths
People from Jarocin
Polish sculptors
Polish male sculptors
People from the Province of Posen
20th-century sculptors
19th-century sculptors
Polish resistance members of World War II